Bas Balkissoon (born ) is a former politician in Ontario, Canada. He was a Liberal member of the Legislative Assembly of Ontario from 2005 to 2016 who represented the riding of Scarborough—Rouge River. From 1988 to 1997 he was a municipal councillor in Scarborough and from 1998 to 2005 he was a councillor in the amalgamated city of Toronto.

Background
Born in Trinidad and Tobago, and of Indian descent, Balkissoon rose to prominence as the head of Scarborough Homeowners Alliance For Fair Taxes, an organization that challenged the province's property assessment system. He is married to Tahay and together they have raised three children. His daughter in law, Laura Jarrett, is an attorney and reporter for CNN, daughter of Valerie Jarrett, former senior advisor to U.S. President Barack Obama.

City Councillor
In 1988, he was elected to Scarborough city council in what was then Ward 13.

With the formation of the new amalgamated city of Toronto, he was elected to Toronto City Council in 1997. As chair of the city's Audit Committee he was credited with uncovering a dubious computer leasing deal between the city and MFP Financial, which eventually led to the formation of the Toronto Computer Leasing Inquiry. Balkissoon also served for a period on the Police Services Board on which he was critical of then-Toronto Police Chief Julian Fantino as well as the Toronto Police Association and its leader at the time, Craig Bromell.

Ontario legislature
In a by-election held on November 24, 2005, Balkissoon was elected as the Member of Provincial Parliament for the riding of Scarborough—Rouge River, replacing Alvin Curling who was appointed as the Canadian ambassador to the Dominican Republic. Balkissoon, as the Liberal Party candidate, won with 58% of the vote. Conservative candidate Cynthia Lai received 24% of the vote and the NDP's Sheila White finished third with 15%. In the Liberal nomination prior to the by-election, the party chose to use a clause in its constitution that declared other candidates invalid, effectively handing the nomination to Balkissoon. This excluded other contenders such as Raymond Cho who considered putting his name forward.

Balkissoon was easily re-elected in the 2007 provincial election, defeating his closest opponent by over 17,000 votes. He was also re-elected in 2011, and 2014.

During his time in office he has been appointed to a number of Parliamentary Assistant roles including Minister of Community Safety and Correctional Services (2006-7, 2014); Minister of Health and Long-Term Care (2007-10); and Minister of Community and Social Services (2010-2013). In 2011 he was named as Deputy Speaker and Chair of the Committee of the Whole House.

On March 22, 2016 Balkissoon resigned from the legislature.

Electoral record

References

External links

1952 births
21st-century Canadian politicians
Canadian Hindus
Canadian politicians of Indian descent
Trinidad and Tobago people of Indian descent
Living people
Ontario Liberal Party MPPs
Toronto city councillors
Trinidad and Tobago emigrants to Canada